Sabine Kusterer (born 4 January 1991) is a German weightlifter. She competed in the women's 58 kg event at the 2016 Summer Olympics held in Rio de Janeiro, Brazil. She also competed in the women's 59 kg event at the 2020 Summer Olympics held in Tokyo, Japan.

References

External links
 

1991 births
Living people
German female weightlifters
Olympic weightlifters of Germany
Weightlifters at the 2016 Summer Olympics
Place of birth missing (living people)
Weightlifters at the 2020 Summer Olympics
21st-century German women